Robert Tucker (1832–1905) was an English mathematician, who was secretary of the London Mathematical Society for more than 30 years.

Life and work 
Son of a soldier who fought in the Peninsular War, Tucker studied at St. John's College, Cambridge, where he was 35th wrangler in 1855. He mastered mathematics at University College London from 1865 to 1899.

He is known by the now known as Tucker circles, a family of circles invariant on parallel displacing.

He is also known by his edition of the Mathematical Papers of William Kingdon Clifford in 1882.

Tucker acted as secretary of the London Mathematical Society from 1867 to 1902.

He was also a collector of mathematician's photographs. His collection, named Tucker collection is preserved by the London Mathematical Society at De Morgan house.

References

Bibliography

External links 
 
 
 

19th-century English mathematicians
1832 births
1905 deaths
Alumni of St John's College, Cambridge